Religious literacy is the knowledge of, and ability to understand, religion. The importance of being religiously literate is increasing as globalisation has created greater links and migration between societies of different faiths and cultures. It has been proposed that including religious literacy as an aspect of public education would improve social cohesion.In addition to being familiar with and comprehending the nature of religious experience, religious literacy is a fundamental understanding of the complexities, contradictions, and difficulties of at least one religious tradition.It embraces diversity and promotes balanced and wise engagement with the religious aspects of human culture.

Beginning with the 2015 Religion Communicators Council Convention in Alexandria, Virginia, religious literacy will be a top priority. As religious communicators, we are aware of the consequences that can arise when the general public and the media are unable to comprehend the cultural and religious nuances of the current events that are taking place in our world today. Conflicts are exacerbated by a lack of awareness of the fundamental beliefs held by various religions around the world. RCC has a role to play as the only faith-oriented accredited public relations association. It uses its interfaith members to help the secular media understand diverse faith dynamics and provides members with resources to help them understand other faith traditions.

Definition 
The term"religious literacy" refers to a fundamental comprehension of the practices, beliefs, and institutions of various global religious traditions.

Ability of Religious Literacy 
Religious literacy requires the ability to discern and analyze the fundamental intersection of religion and social/political/cultural life through multiple perspectives.  More specifically, the religious literate requires a fundamental comprehension of the major texts, beliefs, practices, and contemporary manifestations of several of the world's religious traditions, as well as their history. It is also necessary to be able to identify and investigate the religious aspect of political, social, and cultural expressions across time and space.  Religious literacy requires an understanding of the history and influence of a religion—or multiple religions—both on the surface and within cultural phenomena. Religious literacy is a set of skills that enables you to interact intelligently with religious people and events without falling into some of the pitfalls that frequently hinder comprehension.It resists lumping people together and encourages a mindset that is open and sympathetic to religion without being apologetic or doctrinal. Instead, it looks first at the individual and the community to understand how they experience and express their religion.

The Four Principles of Religious Literacy 

 Religious expression is distinct from the fundamental study of religion.
 Religions are internally diverse.
 Religion changes and develops over time. 
 Religious influence is rooted in all areas of human activity.

References

Further reading 

 Crisp, B.R. (Ed.). (2017). The Routledge Handbook of Religion, Spirituality and Social Work (1st ed.). Routledge. 
 Dinham, A. (2015). "Six: Religious literacy and welfare". In Religious Literacy in Policy and Practice. Bristol, UK: Policy Press. Retrieved Oct 27, 2022.
 Lewis, Thomas A., 'Against Religious Literacy', Why Philosophy Matters for the Study of Religion—and Vice Versa (Oxford, 2015; online edn, Oxford Academic, 19 Nov. 2015).
 Moore, Diane L. (2007) Overcoming Religious Illiteracy: A Cultural Studies Approach to the Study of Religion in Secondary Education
 "Overcoming Religious Illiteracy" (2006). World History Connected.

Sociology of religion
Literacy